St John's  University may refer to:

St. John's University (New York City)
St. John's University School of Law
St. John's University (Italy) - Overseas Campus
College of Saint Benedict and Saint John's University, St. Joseph, Minnesota and Collegeville, Minnesota
St. John's University, Minnesota (CDP), a census-designated place in Minnesota
St. John's University, Shanghai (1887–1952)
St. John's University (Taiwan), successor institution of the Shanghai university
St. John's University (Springfield, Louisiana), an unaccredited institution
St. John's University of Tanzania, Dodoma
St. John's University School of Medicine, unaccredited medical school supposedly based in Montserrat
Saint John's Group of Schools and University, in Bangkok, Thailand

See also 
Saint John's College (disambiguation)